Jérôme Yashin Prior (born 8 August 1995) is a French professional footballer who plays as a goalkeeper for Ligue 2 club Pau.

Career

Girondins de Bordeaux
In 2012, Prior made his debut for Girondins de Bordeaux II. He made his Ligue 1 debut at 15 August 2015 in a 1–1 draw against AS Saint-Étienne.

Miedź Legnica
In February 2019, he signed for Miedź Legnica of the Polish Ekstraklasa on loan until the end of the 2018–19 season.

Valenciennes
In July 2019, Prior joined Ligue 2 club Valenciennes. On 14 August 2021, he moved abroad and signed a one-year deal with Spanish Segunda División side Cartagena.

PAS Giannina
On 29 June 2022, Prior signed a three-year contract with PAS Giannina.

Career statistics

References

External links

1995 births
Living people
Sportspeople from Toulon
Association football goalkeepers
French footballers
Ligue 1 players
Ligue 2 players
Segunda División players
FC Girondins de Bordeaux players
Valenciennes FC players
FC Cartagena footballers
PAS Giannina F.C. players
French expatriate footballers
French expatriate sportspeople in Spain
Expatriate footballers in Spain
French expatriate sportspeople in Greece
Expatriate footballers in Greece
Footballers from Provence-Alpes-Côte d'Azur